Radhasoami Satsang Sabha is the Chief Working Committee of Radhasoami Satsang Dayalbagh. The teachings of Radha Soami sect are based on the spiritual teachings of Shiv Dayal Singh. 
 The Present spiritual leader of Radha Soami Satsang Dayalbagh is Prof Prem Saran Satsangi who is a retired academic Dean Of IIT Delhi and a System Scientist and Physicist.

The Lineage of Radha Soami Satsang Dayalbagh - 1898
Shiv Dayal Singh (1818-1878) Guru and Head of Satsang, 1861-1878
Salig Ram (1829-1898) Guru and Head of Satsang, 1878-1898
Brahm Shankar Misra (1861-1907) Guru and Head of Satsang, 1898-1907
Kamta Prasad Sinha (1871-1913) Guru and Head of Satsang Sabha, 1907-1913
Anand Swarup (1881-1937) Guru and Head of Satsang Sabha, 1913-1937
Gurcharan Das Mehta (1885-1975) Guru and Head of Satsang Sabha, 1937-1975
Mukund Behari Lal (1907-2002) Guru and Head of Satsang Sabha, 1975-2002
Prem Saran Satsangi (1937-) Guru and Head of Satsang Sabha, 2002–Present

See also
 Radha Soami Satsang Beas
 Radha Swami Satsang, Dinod
 Contemporary Sant Mat movements
 Dayalbagh
 Sant Mat

References

External links
http://www.radhasoamisatsang.org/chronology.htm
http://radhasoamidayal.net/GuruIntro.html
http://eacharya.inflibnet.ac.in/data-server/eacharya-documents/548158e2e41301125fd790cf_INFIEP_72/110/ET/72-110-ET-V1-S1__l_.pdf
http://www.dayalbagh.org.in/

Contemporary Sant Mat
Radha Soami
Spiritual organizations